"Sky's the Limit" is the third and final single from The Notorious B.I.G.'s second album Life After Death. It features vocals from R&B group 112 and somber production from Clark Kent. It contains a sample from the songs "My Flame" by Bobby Caldwell and "Keep On" by D. Train. In the US, it was released as a triple A-side along with "Going Back to Cali" and "Kick In the Door". The track was certified Gold by the RIAA. Spike Jonze directed the song's music video.

Music video
The music video was released in December 1997. The music video shows children dressed up as and imitating The Notorious B.I.G., Puff Daddy, Busta Rhymes, Faith Evans, the rest of the Bad Boy crew, and other celebrities.

Track listing

A-side
 "Sky's the Limit" (radio edit) – (4:12)
 "Kick in the Door" (radio edit) – (3:43)
 "Going Back to Cali" (radio edit) – (3:57)
 "Sky's the Limit" (instrumental) – (4:35)

B-side
 "Kick in the Door" (club mix) – (3:43)
 "Going Back to Cali" (club mix) – (3:55)
 "Kick in the Door" (instrumental) – (3:43)
 "Going Back to Cali" (instrumental) – (4:13)

Charts

Certifications

References

The Notorious B.I.G. songs
112 (band) songs
1997 singles
Music videos directed by Spike Jonze
Bad Boy Records singles
Arista Records singles
Songs released posthumously
Songs written by Bobby Caldwell
Songs written by the Notorious B.I.G.
Songs written by Hubert Eaves III